Mistletoe is the common name for many species of parasitic plants.

Mistletoe may also refer to:

 Mistletoe (album), a 2003 comedy album by The Bob & Tom Show
 "Mistletoe" (Colbie Caillat song), 2007
 "Mistletoe" (Justin Bieber song), 2011
 Mistletoe (novel), a 2019 novel by Alison Littlewood
 Mistletoe, Kentucky, an unincorporated community
 Mistletoe (Natchez, Mississippi), a historic house
 USS Mistletoe, three ships of the U.S. Navy

See also 
 Mistletoe Plantation, quail hunting plantation in Florida
 Mistletoe State Park, Georgia 
 Mistletoe Villa, historical place in North Carolina
 Mistel, a type of German bomber during World War II
 Mistilteinn, in Icelandic mythology, Hrómundr Gripsson's sword